Metropolitan Joseph (secular name Ivan Semyonovich Petrovykh, ; 15 December 1872 – 20 November 1937) was a metropolitan of the Russian Orthodox Church. He was a leader of the anti-Soviet nonviolent resistance movement and organizer of the Catacomb Church.

Biography
He was born in Ustyuzhna, Novgorod Governorate.

Metropolitan of Leningrad (1926–27), after the publication in 1927 the "Declaration" by Metropolitan Sergius (Stragorodsky) he led the Josephite Movement. He was against the recognition of the Soviet government by the Russian Orthodox Church in 1927–37.

Before he was killed by the "Soviets", Metropolitan Joseph wrote: "Do not judge me so severely, and clearly understand the following:

 I am not at all a schismatic, and I call not to a schism. but to the purification of the Church from those who sow real schism and provoke it.
 To indicate to another his errors and wrongs is not schism but, to speak simply, it is putting an unbridled horse back into harness.
 The refusal to accept sound reproaches and directives is in reality a schism and a trampling on the truth.
 In the construction of ecclesiastical life the participants are not only those at the head, but the whole body of the Church, and a schismatic is he who assumes to himself rights which exceed his authority and in the name of the Church presumes to say that which is not shared by his colleagues.
 Metropolitan Sergius has shown himself to be such a schismatic, for he has far exceeded his authority and has rejected and scorned the voice of many hierarchs, in whose midst the pure truth has been preserved".

Death and legacy

He was murdered by the Soviet government in 1937 in Kazakhstan. In 1981, Metropolitan Joseph was glorified as a New Martyr by the Russian Orthodox Church Outside Russia, but not by the Russian Orthodox Church.

External links
Metropolitan Joseph (Petrovykh) profile, theorthodox.org; accessed 21 September 2016.

1872 births
1937 deaths
People from Vologda Oblast
20th-century Eastern Orthodox bishops
Bishops of the Russian Orthodox Church
Great Purge victims from Russia
Catacomb Church
Russian anti-communists
Russian people executed by the Soviet Union
1937 murders in Europe